Elections in Ukraine are held to choose the president (head of state), Verkhovna Rada (legislature), and local governments. Referendums may be held on special occasions. Ukraine has a multi-party system, with numerous parties in which often not a single party has a chance of gaining power alone, and parties must work with each other to form coalition governments.

Legislation

Elections in Ukraine are held to choose the President (head of state) and Verkhovna Rada (legislature). The president is elected for a five-year term. The Verkhovna Rada has 450 members and is also elected for a five-year term, but may be dissolved earlier by the president in the case of a failure to form a government. The next election to the Verkhovna Rada, set to be in 2023, will be, for the first time, with different regional open lists (with again an electoral threshold of five percent) and a return, and thus abolition of the constituencies with first-past-the-post voting, to only one national constituency.

From 2012 until the 2019 Ukrainian parliamentary election the Verkhovna Rada was elected using a mixed election system. Half of the representatives were elected from national closed party lists distributed between the parties using the Hare quota with a 5% threshold. The remaining half were elected from constituencies using first-past-the-post voting. This system was adopted for the 2012 elections and was also used for the 2014 election, as a new draft law moving to electing all members using open party lists failed to gather necessary support in the Rada. According to current law, the next election to the Verkhovna Rada (to be held) in 2023 will again be without single-member constituencies and instead deputies can only be elected on a party list in one nationwide constituency with a 5% election threshold with open regional lists of candidates for deputies.

A snap poll must have a voter turnout higher than 50%.

Ukraine's election law forbids outside financing of political parties or campaigns.

Presidential candidates must have had residence in Ukraine for the past ten years prior to election day.

Since late February 2016 a party congress is allowed to remove any candidate from its party list before the Central Election Commission recognizes him or her elected. Meaning that parties after elections can prevent their candidates to take a seat in parliament that they were entitled to due to their place on the party list. A party is (since late February 2016) also allowed to excluded people from its electoral list of the last parliamentary elections.

In Ukraine political campaigning outside election campaign periods is prohibited. But this prohibition is widely ignored in election years and perpetraters are seldom punished since political parties use loopholes in election law.

Local elections

Under the Constitution of Ukraine, the term of office of the heads of villages and towns and the council members of these villages and towns is five years.

Past legislation
The parliamentary election law has been changed four times from 1991 to 2015. Before 1998 all the members of the Parliament were elected by single-seat constituencies (from each electoral district). In 1998 and in 2002 half of the members were elected by proportional representation (faction vote) and the other half by single-seat constituencies. In the 2006 and 2007 parliamentary election, all 450 members of the Verkhovna Rada were elected by party-list proportional representation with closed lists (the same goes for local elections).

In the 2010 Ukrainian local elections four years was set for the office of the heads of villages and towns and the council members of these villages and towns.

Voting patterns
Since the dissolution of the Soviet Union, the Communist Party of Ukraine politically dominated most of Ukraine. By mid 1990s the communists completely lost popularity in western Ukraine, which voted for any representative but communist. Since Leonid Kuchma left presidential post, in 2004 support for the Communist Party shifted towards the Party of Regions being politically dominating mostly over the southeastern Ukraine. At the same time initially led by the People's Movement of Ukraine, political leadership in the non-communist camp was taken over by Our Ukraine bloc and Bloc of Yulia Tymoshenko.

In the elections since 2002 voters of Western and Central Ukrainian oblasts voted mostly for parties (Our Ukraine, Batkivshchyna, UDAR, Self Reliance, Radical Party, Petro Poroshenko Bloc and the People's Front) and presidential candidates (Viktor Yushchenko, Yulia Tymoshenko) with a pro-Western and state reform platform, while voters in Southern and Eastern oblasts of Ukraine voted for parties (CPU, Party of Regions and Opposition Bloc) and presidential candidates (Viktor Yanukovych) with a pro-Russian and status quo platform. Although this geographical division is decreasing. Till the 2014 Ukrainian parliamentary election the electorate of CPU and Party of Regions was very loyal to them. But in the 2014 parliamentary election Party of Regions did not to participate (because of a perceived lack of legitimacy (of the election), because not every resident of the Donbas could vote) and the CPU came 1.12% short of the 5% election threshold. The results were a victory for the pro-Western parties and a major defeat for the pro-Russian camp.

A 2010 study by the Institute of Social and Political Psychology of Ukraine found that in general, Yulia Tymoshenko supporters are more optimistic compared with Viktor Yanukovych supporters. 46 percent of the Tymoshenko's backers expect improvement in their well-being in the next year compared to 30 percent for Yanukovych.

Parliamentary elections

by party list

by constituency

Presidential elections

Voter turnout
From 1994 to 2007 the average voter turnout for the Verkhovna Rada elections was 68.13% The total voter turnout in the 2012 parliamentary elections was then the lowest ever with 57.99%; The lowest turnout in these elections was in Crimea (with 49.46%), the highest in Lviv Oblast (67.13%). In the 2014 parliamentary elections the official voter turnout was set (by the Central Election Commission of Ukraine) at 52.42%. This figure was determined after the Central Electoral Commission deducted the eligible voters in areas were voting was impossible. Because of the ongoing War in Donbass and the unilateral annexation of Crimea by Russia, the 2014 parliamentary elections were not held in Crimea and also not held in parts of Donetsk Oblast and Luhansk Oblast. The lowest turnout in these elections was in Donetsk Oblast (with 32.4%), the highest in again in Lviv Oblast (70%). According to Tadeusz Olszański, of the Centre for Eastern Studies, the low turnout in Donetsk Oblast (and also Luhansk Oblast) is explained by the end of an artificial increase of voter turnout there by Party of Regions officials.

Voter turnout in the presidential elections is always higher than for Verkhovna Rada elections with an average voter turnout of 72% from 2004 till 2010 (67.95% in the 2010 Presidential election). In the 2014 Presidential election the Central Election Commission of Ukraine set the turnout at over 60%; just as in the 2014 parliamentary elections, these elections were not held in Crimea and also not held in parts of Donetsk Oblast and Luhansk Oblast. The most popular presidential elections were the first one in 1991 where nearly 30.6 million people voted and in the 2004 election which gathered some 28 million. There were only three presidential candidates who have gathered over 10 million votes: Leonid Kravchuk (1991 - 19.6, 1994 - 10.0), Viktor Yushchenko (2004 - 11.1), and Viktor Yanukovych (2004 - 11.0). The 10 million voters mark was almost reached by Leonid Kuchma in 1999, but he only gained the trust of 9.6 million. To this day Kravchuk and Petro Poroshenko are the only presidential candidates who won the elections after the first round obtaining over 50% of votes, respective in 1991 and 2014. The person most frequently participating in presidential elections is Oleksandr Moroz who stood in every presidential election since 1994 when he gained the biggest support of some 3.5 million, while in 2010 less than 0.1 million voted for him. Viktor Yanukovych became the strongest runner-up in the history of presidential elections, while Leonid Kuchma - the only runner-up of the first round to pull a win in the second one. Thus far the top two presidential candidates always would get support of over 5 million voters each.

Since the 1994 Ukrainian parliamentary election voter turnouts have been declining. 1994 75.81%, 1998 70.78%, 2002 69.27%, 2006 67.55%, 2007 62.03%, 2012 57.43%, 2014 51.91% and the 2019 Ukrainian parliamentary election at 49.84%.

Perceived flaws in legislation
Despite a clear system for declaring donations to campaign funds, officials and experts say that Ukraine's election law is consistently flouted, with spending from candidates’ official funds representing only a fraction of the amount truly spent while it is rarely clear where the funding comes from.

Early May 2009, the "Committee of Voters of Ukraine" stated they believe that the use of the state's administrative resources by political forces for their own national and local election campaigns is no longer a decisive factor in the outcome of Ukrainian elections. According to a survey of 2,000 people conducted in October 2010 by two Ukrainian nongovernmental organizations, the Democratic Initiatives Fund and OPORA, one in five Ukrainians were willing to sell his or her vote in the then upcoming 2010 Ukrainian local elections. But according to (then) Ukrainian Prime Minister Mykola Azarov these elections "were absolutely without the use of administrative resources, naturally. Nobody interfered with our citizens."

See also
Electoral system 
Electoral calendar

References

External links

Central Election Commission of Ukraine
UKR.VOTE Elections List
Adam Carr's Election Archive
Parties and Elections
Serhiy Vasylchenko: Electoral Geography of Ukraine 1991 - 2010
If parliamentary elections were held next Sunday how would you vote? (Recurrent poll since 2010) by Razumkov Centre
Rating of parties since 2006 by Sociological group "RATING"